Robert Bruce Hicks (July 12, 1921 – November 24, 2012) was an American football player and coach.  He served as the head football coach at Indiana University for one season in 1957, compiling a record of 1–8.

Hicks was born on July 12, 1921 in Hazleton, Pennsylvania.  He attended Hazleton High School, where he played football and basketball before earning a football scholarship from the University of Tennessee.  Hicks died on November 24, 2012.

Head coaching record

References

2012 deaths
1921 births
Indiana Hoosiers football coaches
Tennessee Volunteers football players
Wyoming Cowboys football coaches
People from Hazleton, Pennsylvania